Diana Skotnická is a figure skating coach and former ice dancer who competed for Czechoslovakia. With her brother, Martin Skotnický, she is the 1970 Winter Universiade champion and a five-time Czechoslovak national champion (1970–1974).

Career

Competitive 
Skotnická competed in partnership with her brother, Martin Skotnický. Their coaches included Ivan Mauer, Hilda Múdra, and Míla Nováková. The siblings took silver at the 1968 Winter Universiade in Innsbruck, Austria.

In the 1969–1970 season, Skotnická/Skotnický won the first of their five consecutive national titles and placed 11th at the World Championships in Ljubljana, Yugoslavia. They concluded their season with gold at the 1970 Winter Universiade in Rovaniemi, Finland.

Skotnická/Skotnický competed at nine ISU Championships. Their best continental result, sixth, came at the 1973 European Championships in Cologne, West Germany. A few weeks later, they would achieve their career-best world result, finishing eighth at the 1973 World Championships in Bratislava, Czechoslovakia. The two retired from competition in 1974.

Post-competitive 
Skotnická began coaching in France in 1974. She was formerly based in Courbevoie. She has coached the following skaters:
 Christopher Boyadji
 Adeline Canac
 Adeline Canac / Yannick Bonheur
 Frédéric Dambier
 Candice Didier
 Jean-Michel Debay
 Stanick Jeannette
 Camille Mendoza / Christopher Boyadji
 Gabriel Monnier
 Elodie Eudine

Results 
(with Martin Skotnický)

References 

1940s births
Living people
Czechoslovak female ice dancers
Slovak figure skating coaches
Figure skaters from Bratislava
Universiade medalists in figure skating
Slovak female ice dancers
Universiade gold medalists for Czechoslovakia
Competitors at the 1968 Winter Universiade
Competitors at the 1970 Winter Universiade